Apostates is a genus of flowering plants in the daisy family.

There is only one known species, Apostates rapae,  endemic to the Tubuai Islands in French Polynesia.

References

Bahieae
Flora of the Tubuai Islands